Joseph Marie Auguste Bidez (9 April 1867 – 20 September 1945) was a Belgian classical philologist. He was Professor of Classical Philology and the History of Philosophy at the University of Ghent.

References 

Officiers of the Légion d'honneur
1945 deaths
Belgian classical scholars
Classical philologists
Academic staff of Ghent University
University of Liège alumni
People from Frameries
Corresponding Fellows of the British Academy
Members of the Académie des Inscriptions et Belles-Lettres
Order of Leopold (Belgium)
Grand Officers of the Order of the Crown (Belgium)
1867 births